Stephen Flynn may refer to:

 Stephen Flynn (Irish politician) (died 1960), Irish Fianna Fáil politician
 Stephen Flynn (Scottish politician), Scottish National Party politician and MP